The Hsieh-ho Power Plant is an oil-fired power plant in Zhongshan District, Keelung, Taiwan. The power plant is the only fully oil-fired power plant in Taiwan.

History
The power plant started its operation after the commissioning of its first generation unit in January 1977.

Generation units
The power plant consists of four 500-MW generation units. The third 500-MW unit was finished on 19 December 1979 after a record-breaking construction period of 26 months. It went into operation in March 1980. The fourth 500-MW unit was completed in 1985 after 29 months construction period.

The units 1 and 2 were decommissioned on Dec. 31, 2019.

Components
The steam generator is rated at 1,701 tonne/hour, 176 kg/cm2 and 542 °C at superheater outlet and reheat to 542 °C.

The steam turbine is a tandem-compound with four flow exhaust, 3,600 rpm single reheat with throttle steam conditions of 166 kg/cm2, 538 °C with reheat to 538 °C.

The stacks are 200 meters high slip-form reinforced concrete stack.

Transportation
Hsieh-ho Power Plant is accessible North from Keelung Station of Taiwan Railways.

See also

 List of power stations in Taiwan
 Electricity sector in Taiwan

References

1977 establishments in Taiwan
Buildings and structures in Keelung
Energy infrastructure completed in 1977
Oil-fired power stations in Taiwan